These are the number-one singles of 1986 according to the Top 100 Singles chart in Cash Box magazine.

See also 
1986 in music
List of Hot 100 number-one singles of 1986 (U.S.)

Sources
http://members.aol.com/_ht_a/randypny4/cashbox/1986.html
http://www.cashboxmagazine.com/archives/80s_files/1986.html
https://web.archive.org/web/20060614052228/http://musicseek.info/no1hits/1986.htm

1986
1986 record charts
1986 in American music